Cochlostoma canestrinii is a species of small land snail with an operculum, a terrestrial gastropod mollusk in the family  Cochlostomatidae.

Distribution and habitat
This species is endemic to Italy. It lives in rocky limestone areas.

References

Diplommatinidae
Endemic fauna of Italy
Gastropods described in 1876
Taxonomy articles created by Polbot